Ely Yissachar Merzbach (born 11 February 1950) is an Israeli mathematician and emeritus professor at Bar-Ilan University's Department of Mathematics and the Gonda Brain Research Center.

Biography
Ely Merzbach was born in 1950 in Paris, where he attended École Yabné. He immigrated to Israel at the age of 17, studying for a year at Yeshivat Be'er Ya'akov and then enlisting in the Nahal Brigade of the Israel Defense Forces. He obtained a B.Sc. in mathematics and statistics and an M.Sc. in mathematics from the Hebrew University of Jerusalem, and completed his doctoral studies in 1979 at Ben-Gurion University of the Negev.

Academic career
After working as a postdoctoral fellow at Paris 6 and the École Polytechnique, Merzbach joined the faculty at Bar-Ilan University in 1980, becoming full professor in 1993.

His research focuses on point processes theory, measure theory, stochastic geometry, and applications thereof.

He served as head of the Bar-Ilan's Department of Mathematics and Computer Science from 1991, academic head of Ariel University from 1996 to 1997, and was elected dean of the Faculty of Exact Sciences at Bar-Ilan in 1997.

References

External links
 

1950 births
Academic staff of Bar-Ilan University
Ben-Gurion University of the Negev alumni
French emigrants to Israel
French Orthodox Jews
Einstein Institute of Mathematics alumni
Israeli mathematicians
Israeli Orthodox Jews
Living people
Probability theorists
Academic staff of Ariel University